Julia Glushko and Paula Ormaechea were the defending champions, having won the event in 2013, but both players chose to participate at the Internazionali BNL d'Italia instead. 

Verónica Cepede Royg and María Irigoyen won the title, defeating Sharon Fichman and Johanna Konta in the final, 7–5, 6–3.

Seeds

Draw

References 
 Draw

Open Saint-Gaudens Midi-Pyrenees - Doubles